Keldron is an unincorporated community in Corson County, South Dakota, United States. Although not tracked by the Census Bureau, Keldron has been assigned the ZIP code of 57634.

Keldron was laid out in 1909, and named for its location in a caldron-shaped valley.

References

Unincorporated communities in Corson County, South Dakota
Unincorporated communities in South Dakota